James W. Porter II (born February 7, 1949) is an American lawyer who was president of the National Rifle Association from 2013 to 2015. Born in Birmingham in 1949, his father, Irvine Porter, was president before him, serving from 1959 to 1961.  He is also a sixth-generation Alabama landowner and is a strong advocate for wildlife management and hunting.

In 2014 Maria Butina presented then-NRA president Porter with an honorary membership in "".

Controversial positions
Porter called President Obama a "fake President" and advocated that civilians should be trained in the use of military weapons for both international and domestic war. He refers to the American Civil War as the War of Northern Aggression, widely seen as a racist term.

References

Living people
Presidents of the National Rifle Association
American gun rights activists
1949 births